Bohalis (alternatively Bohalas ) is a small townland in County Roscommon. It is located on the N5 road in Ireland between Ballaghaderreen, County Roscommon and Carracastle, County Mayo.

References

Townlands of County Mayo
Townlands of County Roscommon